Antonio Díaz Cascajosa (Badia del Vallès, Barcelona, 1986), better known by his stage name El Mago Pop, is a Spanish illusionist.

He is the first European illusionist to have a one-person television program broadcasting in 150 countries through Discovery Channel (Mexico, Argentina, Uruguay, Chile, Ecuador, The United States, Venezuela, Bolivia, Italy, France...). He has stunned celebrities such as Stephen Hawking, Neymar, Victoria Beckham, Carlos Slim, Nick Mason, Zinedine Zidane and Antonio Banderas, among others with his magic games.

Since 2016 he became the highest-grossing artist in Spain and the highest-grossing illusionist in Europe, with more than 250 million euros raised.

The trip to New York

On March 25, 2014, Antonio teleported to New York City live on TV in Andreu Buenafuente's TV show En el aire, achieving a great national and international impact.

Diverse international media consider Antonio Díaz to be one of the young illusionists with more projection in the world.

Theatre

Antonio Díaz began exhibiting his shows in theaters all over Spain at the age of 17. After several shows (Dreams, The Night Abbozzi and The Amazing Story of Mr. Snow) he created The Great Illusion, the spectacle that catapulted him to fame.

Premiered at the Teatre Borràs in Barcelona in December 2013, it moved to the Teatre Coliseum where it became the most successful show in Barcelona for 12 consecutive weeks, beating the great musicals at the box office. After several hundred thousand spectators, the return of The Great Illusion to the Coliseum Theatre in Barcelona was announced in April 2015. In September 2015 and until April 2016, he settled at the historic Teatro Calderón in Madrid where he broke all the box office records. So much so, that the theater management put the name of the illusionist to one of its boxes for being the first artist to exceed 130.000 spectators in the same season. The show "The Great Illusion" said goodbye in July, 2017 at the Starlite Festival, after having been seen by more than 800.000 spectators in three years, becoming the highest-grossing illusionist show in history in Europe.

In September 2017, the new "Nada Es Imposible" premiered at the Rialto Theater in Madrid.

Antonio Díaz, El Mago Pop, has announced that he will take his new show “Nada es Imposible” to Broadway, but this time the trip is the other way around, from the Gran Via de Madrid to the mecca of musicals.

Teatre Victoria

In March 2019 Antonio Díaz he managed to materialize one of his “vital dreams” and purchased the Teatre Victoria in Barcelona from the company "3 per tres" (composed by Dagoll Dagom, Tricicle and Anexa) for an amount close to 30 million euros.

Television

In November 2013, El Mago Pop premiered on Discovery Max, scoring a 4.8% screen share and 810.000 viewers, being one of the most watched stations in the history of the channel. In that first special he managed to surprise with his hand games Love of Lesbian, Eduard Punset, Ferrán Adria, Ruth Lorenzo, Alejo Sauras and Nick Mason, drummer of the legendary band Pink Floyd.

In May 2014 the new season premiered, where it managed to amaze one of the world's brightest minds, Stephen Hawking.

El Mago Pop aired in 148 countries around the world (Venezuela, Mexico, Chile, Bolivia, Ecuador, Italy, Argentina, the Netherlands, France, the United Kingdom) and in May 2014 it was presented at the UP-FRONT in New York, becoming one of the first Discovery Europe productions to broadcast in the United States.

In October 2014 he began collaborating in the Antena3 TV show "Los Viernes al Show" on Fridays, where he made a weekly game to artists such as Pablo Alborán, Mario Casas, or José Coronado.

He has been interviewed in "En El Aire" (La Sexta), "Zapeando" (La Sexta), "Las Mañanas de la 1" (TVE), "Els Matins de TV3", and in "La Ventana" (Cadena Ser).

Also, in early 2016, a TV special was released in La Sexta, which received the same title as its successful show, "The Great Illusion".

During 2016 and 2017 he continued to perform in programs for Discovery Channel, where he was interviewed by Don Francisco, one of the most important presenters in the United States.

During the pandemic, he launches an original ad in collaboration with Danone in more than 20 channels making all the screens in Spain became white and achieving a 75% share results.

Since October 2021, he has also been on Netflix with The great illusion, the montage that gave him fame and in which he leaves both passersby and celebrities with their mouths open. Penelope Cruz, Javier Bardem, Victoria Beckam, Zinedine Zidane, Antonio Banderas and Arnold Schwarzenegger are just some of the famous people he has left speechless.

On 2021 March 26th, Netflix premiered ‘Magic for Humans’ with El Mago Pop which provokes a disruption to the conventional narrative and before you know it, you’ve already watched three more episodes than you’d originally planned.

Records

In October 2019 his show "Nada Es Imposible" became the biggest pre-sale show in the history of Spain, beating the Lion King of Madrid.

In 2017 and 2018 he was the artist selling the most tickets in Spain, and the highest-grossing illusionist in Europe.

Broadway

Antonio Diaz will take his show to New York in a few months. He will be the youngest illusionist in history and the first non-American illusionist to achieve this.

Nothing is Impossible

On March 11, 2020, due to the state of emergency caused by the Coronavirus, the show temporarily stopped.

As soon as COVID-19 restrictions were lifted, El Mago Pop began filling his theatre Victoria again since September 2020 breaking sales records and becoming the most successful and most seen show around the world.

In February 2022 he achieved the iconic amount of 2 Million theatregoers in his shows.

References 

Spanish magicians
1986 births
Living people